Aspirus MedEvac is a not-for-profit medical transportation and air ambulance service providing emergency air and ground medical transport for critically ill and injured individuals in North Central Wisconsin and Upper Michigan. The fleet comprises 1 helicopter and 12 ambulances. In late 2015, Aspirus MedEvac achieved NAAMTA Medical Transport Accreditation for their rotor-wing and ground programs. Aspirus MedEvac has safely transported more than 25,000 patients since 2007 and as grown from 20 members to 80 plus.

History 
Aspirus MedEvac originated as Aspirus Critical Care Transport in a single ambulance in 1995. In 2007, the air and ground programs were combined  and rebranded as Aspirus MedEvac. The same year, MedEvac received its first aircraft (a Bell Helicopter 206) from CJ Air Systems. CJ Systems was thereafter bought by Air Methods Corporation. Air Methods was the vendor for the Aspirus system competitor; therefore, the decision was made to switch to PHI Air Medical as a part 135 vendor. Under the agreement, PHI Air Medical provides the helicopter, mechanics, and pilots; and, Aspirus provides all aspects related to medical care and clinical oversight. In 2008, MedEvac upgraded their helicopter from a Bell 206  to a Bell 407 which boasted greater speed and range capabilities as well all around increased performance more suitable for HEMS. 2017 marked the 10 year anniversary of air medical transport provided by Aspirus and Aspirus MedEvacIn January 2021, Aspirus Health announced plans to acquire Ascension's Spirit air and ground transport service in addition to 7 Ascension hospitals and 21 clinics in Northern Wisconsin.

Air Transport 

The MedEvac Bell 407 helicopter is equipped with safety gear including night-vision goggles, satellite tracking, and enhanced operational control. Medevac medical crews are extensively trained in critical care medicine. Both paramedics and nurses must have minimum of 3–5 years experience in related fields as well achieve special certifications such as FP-C and CFRN. The flight team has broad scope of practice and can provide nearly all acute care procedures needed to stabilize a critical ill patient. MedEvac is supported by Aspirus Wausau Hospital's Level II Trauma Center with the added benefit of being able to carry multiple units of blood products on every flight. In March 2021, Aspirus MedEvac announced the helicopter base would be relocated to Woodruff, WI to provide more timely access to critical care in Northcentral Wisconsin.

Ground Transport 
Aspirus MedEvac has ground ambulances based in the Upper Peninsula of Michigan and North Central Wisconsin. Wisconsin bases includes: Weston/Wausau, Medford, Rhinelander, Wisconsin Rapids, and Stevens Point. In addition, MedEvac has several bases in the UP that provide both CCT and 911 services.

In 2014, Aspirus MedEvac expanded its medical transport services into the Upper Peninsula opening a ground base near Aspirus Ontonagon Hospital. Thereafter, Aspirus added 911/transport rigs in Iron River and Crystal Falls. The Iron County Bases also provide 911 services for Watersmeet, MI. In 2017, Aspirus purchased 3 LUCAS CPR machines for UP bases to help increase out-of-hospital survival.

Aspirus ground ambulances are typically staffed with an EMT/driver, NREMT-P/CCP, and a Critical Care Nurse. The ground transport rigs have nearly all the capabilities of the aircraft minus in situ blood products. Ground transport is able to provide speciality transports such as NICU and ECMO teams. MedEvac primarily provides medical transport for the Aspirus Network; however, they also serve as an additional resource to Spirit Medical Transport (owned by Ministry Health Care/Ascension).

Advanced Life Support Paramedic Intercepts 

Aspirus MedEvac also provides ALS intercepts for municipal EMT-Basic Fire/EMS services. Intercepts are primarily provided in Marathon County, Forest County, & Taylor County (and some of Price County) WI. Most commonly, MedEvac is requested for patients that require pain management, cardiac related illness, trauma, and patients with unstable hemodynamics. On average, MedEvac is requested for 1-2 intercepts per day in Marathon County.

Neonatal Intensive Care Transport Team 
Working in conjunction Aspirus Wausau Hospital's Anya Marie Jackson Newborn Intensive Care Unit (NICU), MedEvac is equipped and trained to provide both air and ground NICU transport. Thanks to a donation from the B.A. & Esther Greenheck Foundation, MedEvac was gifted 2 transport isolettes enabling MedEvac and the transport team the ability to safely retrieve twins. When MedEvac is unavailable, South Area Fire will provide an ambulance and convey the NICU team and isolette to the patient and back to the receiving NICU facility.

References 

Air ambulance services in the United States